MacDonald Taylor Jr. (born March 22, 1992) is a United States Virgin Islands international soccer player who plays as a midfielder.

Career
Taylor has played for Skills FC and Seton Hill University.

He made his international debut for United States Virgin Islands in 2006, and has appeared in FIFA World Cup qualifying matches.

International goals
Scores and results list United States Virgin Islands' goal tally first.

Personal life
His father is MacDonald Taylor Sr.

References

1992 births
Living people
People from Saint Croix, U.S. Virgin Islands
United States Virgin Islands people of Trinidad and Tobago descent
United States Virgin Islands soccer players
United States Virgin Islands international soccer players
Seton Hill University alumni

Association football midfielders
United States Virgin Islands under-20 international soccer players
United States Virgin Islands youth international soccer players